Alfonso Stoopen (4 March 1902 – 22 December 1967) was a Mexican high jumper and long jumper who competed in the 1924 Summer Olympics. He was born in San Luis Potosí.

References

1902 births
1967 deaths
Mexican male high jumpers
Mexican male long jumpers
Sportspeople from San Luis Potosí
People from San Luis Potosí City
Olympic athletes of Mexico
Athletes (track and field) at the 1924 Summer Olympics
Central American and Caribbean Games gold medalists for Mexico
Competitors at the 1926 Central American and Caribbean Games
Central American and Caribbean Games medalists in athletics
20th-century Mexican people